D-na may refer to:

 DNA, genetic-coding compound
 D'ni, race of non-player characters in Myst computer-game series

See also 
 Na-dene, Native-American language family